Nepeta troodi, commonly known as Troodos cat-mint is a suberect, aromatic, perennial herb, 20–50 cm high, with a woody base and hairy tetragonal shoots. Leaves opposite, simple, serrate, cordate at base, deltoid, apex obtuse, 1-4 x 0.6–2 cm, petiolate, densely hairy. Flowers in many flowered verticillasters, zygomorphic, corolla white with the lower lip dotted purple. Flowers June to October. Fruit of 4 nutlets.

Habitat
Rocky slopes, forest clearings or under pines on igneous rocks, altitude 1100–1950 m.

Distribution
Endemic to Cyprus where it is confined to the higher peaks of Troödos where it is not uncommon: Khnionistra, Prodromos, Troodos Square, Loumata Aeton, Xerocolymbos, Papoutsa.

References

External links
 http://www.treknature.com/gallery/photo262007.htm
 http://www.theplantlist.org/tpl/record/kew-135049
 http://plants.jstor.org/specimen/mpu017442
 http://www.moa.gov.cy/moa/fd/fd.nsf/All/4899F3295C11C687C22577A70036E161/$file/Nepeta troodi-1.jpg?OpenElement
 http://eurekamag.com/research/008/160/anatomical-phytochemical-study-nepeta-troodi-holmboe-labiatae-endemic-cyprus.php
 http://ww2.bgbm.org/EuroPlusMed/PTaxonDetail.asp?NameCache=Nepeta troodi

troodi
Endemic flora of Cyprus